The Secret of Birth is a 2013 South Korean television series that aired on SBS from April 27 to June 23, 2013, on Saturdays and Sundays at 22:00 for 18 episodes. It stars Sung Yu-ri as a genius amnesiac who pieces together her own life in the wake of her memory loss, while Yoo Jun-sang plays her husband who sets out to reclaim what they once had.

Plot
Jung Yi-hyun is a genius, but she suffers from psychogenic amnesia and does not remember her husband and young daughter. Hong Gyung-doo is uneducated and poor, but he's a loving father to young Hae-deum, who's inherited her genius from her mother. Yi-hyun and Gyung-doo met just as both were on the brink of suicide, and they'd decided to choose life together. The drama is about Yi-hyun's journey to putting together the pieces of her lost memory with her husband's help, a man who seems completely unsuited for her. The story explores the relationship from the viewpoint of both parties.

Cast
Sung Yu-ri - Jung Yi-hyun
Kim So-hyun - young Yi-hyun
Yoo Jun-sang - Hong Gyung-doo
Kal So-won - Hong Hae-deum
Lee Jin - Lee Sun-young  
Lee Hyang-sook - young Sun-young
Kim Young-kwang - Park Soo-chang
Kim Kap-soo - Choi Kook
Lee Hyo-jung - Choi Seok 
Han Sang-jin - Choi Ki-tae
Jin Hyuk - Choi Ki-joong
Yoo Hye-ri - Mrs. Jo, Choi Seok's wife
Jo Mi-ryung - Shim Yeon-jung
Jung Suk-yong - Tae-man
Shin Seung-hwan - Jong-tae
Park Eun-ji - Kwang-sook
Seo Hyun-chul - Go Eun-pyo
Kim Hye-jin - Lee Hye-young
Choi Su-rin - Jung Joo-gyum

International broadcast
 It aired in Japan on cable channel KNTV from April 27 to June 23, 2013 with Japanese subtitles.
 It aired in Vietnam on VTC9 Let's Viet from March 12, 2015.

References

External links
  
 

2013 South Korean television series debuts
2013 South Korean television series endings
Seoul Broadcasting System television dramas
Korean-language television shows
South Korean romance television series
Television series by IHQ (company)